Maloyaroslavets is a town and the administrative center of Maloyaroslavetsky District in Kaluga Oblast, Russia, located on the right bank of the Luzha River (Oka's basin),  northeast of Kaluga, the administrative center of the oblast. Population:  21,200 (1970).

History
It was founded in the late 14th century by Vladimir the Bold and named Yaroslavets after his son Yaroslav. In 1485, the town was annexed by the Grand Duchy of Moscow and renamed Maloyaroslavets to distinguish it from Yaroslavl. During the French invasion of Russia, the Battle of Maloyaroslavets took place near this town on October 12 (24) of 1812. The battle was commemorated by a roomy cathedral built at the Black Island (Chyornoostrovsky) Convent of Maloyaroslavets by 1843.

A number of fierce battles were also fought near Maloyaroslavets during the Battle of Moscow in 1941–1942. The town was under German occupation from 18 October 1941 until 2 January 1942. It was liberated by troops of the Western Front of the Red Army.

Administrative and municipal status
Within the framework of administrative divisions, Maloyaroslavets serves as the administrative center of Maloyaroslavetsky District, to which it is directly subordinated. As a municipal division, the town of Maloyaroslavets is incorporated within Maloyaroslavetsky Municipal District as Maloyaroslavets Urban Settlement.

Twin towns and sister cities

Maloyaroslavets is twinned with:
 Barysaw, Belarus
 Ischia, Italy
 Serpukhov, Russia
 Aleksin, Russia

Gallery

References

Notes

Sources

Further reading
 Maloyaroslavets. Materials for the History of the 17th and 18th centuries (1884) (Малоярославец. Материалы для истории города XVII и XVIII столетий) at Runivers.ru in DjVu and PDF formats

Cities and towns in Kaluga Oblast
Maloyaroslavetsky Uyezd